Line 2 of the Changchun Rail Transit is a rapid transit line running from west to east Changchun.

History

Phase 1
Phase 1 of Line 2 started operation on 30 August 2018. It is 20.5 km long with 18 stations.

Western extension
The western extension to  opened on 8 October 2021. The extension is 4.36 km in length.

Opening timeline

Service routes
  —

Stations

Future Development
Eastern extension
An eastern extension to Zhaojiagang East is under construction. The extension is 10.607 km in length. It's scheduled to open in 2025.

References

Changchun Rail Transit lines
2018 establishments in China
Railway lines opened in 2018